Desmond Emil "Dez" Fitzpatrick (born December 17, 1997) is an American football wide receiver for the Pittsburgh Steelers of the National Football League (NFL). He played college football at Louisville.

Professional career

Tennessee Titans
Fitzpatrick was drafted by the Titans in the fourth round with the 109th overall pick in the 2021 NFL Draft. Fitzpatrick signed his four-year rookie contract with Tennessee on May 17, 2021. He was waived on August 31, 2021, and re-signed to the practice squad. Fitzpatrick was signed to the active roster on November 13, 2021, following Julio Jones being placed on injured reserve. On November 23, Fitzpatrick scored his first career touchdown against the Houston Texans on an 18-yard reception from Ryan Tannehill.

On August 30, 2022, Fitzpatrick was waived by the Titans and signed to the practice squad the next day.  His practice squad contract with the team expired after the season on January 7, 2023.

Pittsburgh Steelers
On January 11, 2023, Fitzpatrick signed a reserve/future contract with the Pittsburgh Steelers.

References

External links
 Louisville Cardinals bio

1997 births
Living people
American football wide receivers
Louisville Cardinals football players
People from Farmington Hills, Michigan
Players of American football from Michigan
Sportspeople from Oakland County, Michigan
Tennessee Titans players
Pittsburgh Steelers players